The Source (Bell) Electronics Inc., doing business as The Source, is a Canadian consumer electronics and cell phone retail chain. The chain goes back over 40 years in Canada, initially as Radio Shack and later as The Source by Circuit City.  The Source is now owned by BCE Inc., which purchased the assets of InterTAN from its parent, American retailer Circuit City, in 2009. The Source is a unit of 4458729 Canada Inc. and is based in Barrie, Ontario.

Background

The Source began as the Canadian branch of Radio Shack (later "RadioShack"). The chain was originally owned by Radio Shack's American parent company Tandy Corporation, but was spun off in June 1986, along with the rest of Tandy's international operations, as InterTAN. A licensing agreement with what became RadioShack Corporation allowed InterTAN to continue to use the chain's name and logo. InterTAN abandoned its non-profitable West German stores in 1987, left Belgium and France in 1993, sold its British stores to Carphone Warehouse in 1999 and sold its Australian stores to Woolworth subsidiary Dick Smith Electronics in 2002, leaving just the Canadian Radio Shack, Battery Plus, and Rogers Plus stores.

In May 2004, InterTAN was acquired by Circuit City. One week after the acquisition was completed, RadioShack Corporation filed a lawsuit in the 352nd Judicial District Court in Tarrant County, Texas, to end the licensing agreement. RadioShack Corporation claimed that InterTAN had breached the terms of their agreement. On March 24, 2005, the district court judge ruled in favour of RadioShack and cancelled the agreement. The ruling prohibited InterTAN from using the brand name on its stores or in any of its products, packaging, and advertising after June 30, 2005.

On April 26, 2005, Circuit City announced that the stores would be renamed The Source by Circuit City  (La Source par Circuit City in Quebec).  The rebranding process was completed in the majority of the chain's Canadian stores by July 1, 2005. The chain also introduced new house brands, including Nexxtech and Vital, in place of RadioShack store brands.

In February 2007, The Source announced it would close down 62 low volume stores across Canada.  On March 30, 2007, Circuit City announced to its shareholders that it was seeking options including selling off the InterTAN/The Source subsidiary to cut losses. On November 10, 2008, InterTAN sought protection from its creditors, after Circuit City filed for Chapter 11 bankruptcy.

Circuit City announced on January 16, 2009, that its namesake U.S. stores would be liquidated. The Source was not affected by the announcement, and a process followed to sell the Canadian operations as a growing concern.

On March 2, 2009, Canadian telecommunications firm Bell Canada announced it would acquire The Source and continue to operate it as an independent division. The acquisition was completed July 1 for the final purchase price of $135 million US, following which the chain removed the "by Circuit City" from its name. Prior to January 2010, the stores sold mobile phone services from Bell's main competitor, Rogers Wireless; at that point, the chain began to exclusively market Bell-owned wireless (including value brand Virgin Mobile), television, and internet services.

The Source continues to sell a full array of consumer electronics products.

Products

The Source stocks a wide array of products. Most of the products are consumer electronics, including: cellular phones, computers, computer accessories, televisions, DVD players, Blu-ray players, home theatre systems, clock radios, traditional telephones, toys, SiriusXM satellite radios, console gaming equipment, cables (such as HDMI, DVI, component, composite/RCA, VGA, S-Video, USB, serial, etc.), Bell devices, Virgin Mobile devices, Bell Satellite TV, and MP3 players, as well as a large selection of headphones including models by Sony and Skullcandy.

The Source also carries house brand products under brands such as Bright, Headrush, Kapsule, Nexxtech, Vital and Xtreme Gaming.

References

External links

 The Source
 RadioShack Catalogs (1939-2005)

Bell Canada
Companies based in Barrie
Retail companies established in 1986
Consumer electronics retailers of Canada
Canadian brands
RadioShack
Circuit City
2004 mergers and acquisitions
2009 mergers and acquisitions
1986 establishments in Ontario